William John Bell (born 3 September 1937) is a Scottish former football player and manager. He played as a left back.

Bell was born in Johnstone, Renfrewshire. He played for Queen's Park in the Scottish Football League and for Leeds United, Leicester City and Brighton & Hove Albion in the English Football League. He played more than 200 league games for Leeds United in the 1960s. Leeds had many hard men but Bell was only cautioned once with a booking in over 200 games for Leeds. Norman Hunter said of him "Willie Bell was one of the bravest men I have seen in my life. He never blinked, he never flinched, he just went for it." The Definitive History of Leeds United published a small biography of Bell titled Willie Bell – Hewn of Scottish granite saying he was "a consistent force at left back for Leeds between 1962 and 1967" as well as being "one of a clutch of old hands amongst a squad of novices as United sprinted to the top of the English game".

Bell played in the 1965 FA Cup Final and multiple European club competitions.

At international level, Bell represented Scotland multiple times at various levels including being called up twice for full-international duty. His International career included a 1–1 draw with Brazil in 1966 at Hampden Park. Bell had one of the stronger outings that day, effectively shutting Jairzinho out of the match.

After retiring from playing, Bell managed Birmingham City and Lincoln City, and then moved to the United States, where he coached the Liberty University Flames in Lynchburg, Virginia. Bell spent 21 seasons coaching at Liberty, compiling a 198-149-40 record overseeing the Flames transition from the NAIA to NCAA Division II and eventually NCAA Division I status in 1987. Bell received a Doctorate Degree from Liberty University upon his retirement and was later inducted into the Liberty University Flames Hall of Fame.

Bell is a devout Christian and an ordained minister, who together with wife Mary founded a ministry which visits prisons in England and the United States. He wrote an autobiography of his life in 2014 called "The Light at the End of the Tunnel".

Honours 

 FL First Division
Runners-up: 1964–65, 1965–66
FL Second Division:
Champions: 1963–64
FA Cup
 Runners-up: 1964–65
Inter-Cities Fairs Cup
 Runners-up: 1966–67
Liberty Athletics Hall of Fame:
Inducted: 2011

References

External links 

Living people
1937 births
People from Johnstone
Scottish footballers
Scotland international footballers
Association football fullbacks
Queen's Park F.C. players
Leeds United F.C. players
Leicester City F.C. players
Brighton & Hove Albion F.C. players
Scottish Football League players
English Football League players
Scottish football managers
Scottish expatriate football managers
Birmingham City F.C. managers
Lincoln City F.C. managers
Liberty Flames soccer coaches
Footballers from Renfrewshire
Scotland amateur international footballers
Scottish expatriate sportspeople in the United States
Expatriate soccer managers in the United States
FA Cup Final players